Yu Qingjiang (born September 1963) is a lieutenant general (zhong jiang) of the People's Liberation Army Air Force (PLAAF) of China, serving as chief of staff of the People's Liberation Army Air Force since December 2017. Previously he served as president of the PLA Air Force Command College. He is a representative of the 19th National Congress of the Chinese Communist Party.

Biography
Yu was born in Nanjing, Jiangsu, in September 1963. He graduated from Air Force Political College, Russian Air Force Military Academy, Air Force Engineering University, and the PLA National Defence University.

He served as commander of the 30th Air Force Aviation Division of Shenyang Military Region before being appointed as commander of the PLA Air Force Dalian Base in June 2007. In 2009, he became deputy chief of staff of the Air Force of Jinan Military Region, rising to chief of staff in 2013. In October 2015, he was made president the PLA Air Force Command College, succeeding Ma Jian. In December 2017, he rose to become chief of staff of the People's Liberation Army Air Force.

He was promoted to the rank of major general (Shaojiang) in December 2010 and lieutenant general (zhongjiang) in June 2019.

Personal life 

References

1963 births
Living people
People from Nanjing
PLA National Defence University alumni
People's Liberation Army generals from Jiangsu
People's Liberation Army Air Force generals